Daquqabad (also Romanized as Daqūqābād; also known as Coghābād, Dūghābād, Dūjābād, and Dūqābād) is a village in Bahreman Rural District, Nuq District, Rafsanjan County, Kerman Province, Iran. At the 2006 census, its population was 833, in 223 families.

References 

Populated places in Rafsanjan County